WAJB-LP was a Southern Gospel formatted broadcast radio station licensed to Wellston, Ohio, serving the Wellston/Coalton area.  WAJB-LP was owned and operated by The Calvary Connection Independent Holiness Church.

On November 10, 2019, the station's license was surrendered "with deep regret" to the FCC due to "failing health, financial, and other reasons" by the church's pastor.

References

External links
 

AJB-LP
AJB-LP
AJB-LP
Defunct religious radio stations in the United States
Defunct radio stations in the United States
Radio stations disestablished in 2019